The 2016–17 Florida State Seminoles men's basketball team, variously Florida State or FSU, represented Florida State University during the 2016–17 NCAA Division I men's basketball season. The Seminoles were led by head coach Leonard Hamilton, in his fifteenth year, and played their home games at the Donald L. Tucker Center on the university's Tallahassee, Florida campus as members of the Atlantic Coast Conference.

The Seminoles achieved their best start in school history, winning 15 of their first 16 games and six of their first seven conference games, including a stretch that included six straight ranked opponents. Over the course of the season, Dwayne Bacon became the 46th Seminole player, and only the second sophomore, to score a thousand career points. They set their record for most regular season wins, tied their record for most ACC wins in a single season and went undefeated at home for the first time since the 1975–76 season. Jonathan Isaac and Dwayne Bacon went on to be selected in the NBA draft.

Florida State finished in a three-way tie for second in the ACC and reached the semifinals of the ACC tournament. The Seminoles received an at-large bid to the NCAA tournament as a three-seed in the west region, their first tournament appearance since 2012, where they reached the second round.

Previous season
The Seminoles finished the 2015–16 season 20–14, 8–10 in ACC play, to finish in a tie for eleventh place. They defeated Boston College in the first round of the ACC tournament before losing to Virginia Tech. The Seminoles received an invitation to the National Invitation Tournament where they defeated Davidson before losing to eventual NIT champ, Valparaiso.

Guard Malik Beasley was taken in the first round of the NBA draft by the Denver Nuggets.

Preseason
Prior to the start of the season, Florida State was picked to finish eighth in the ACC while Dwayne Bacon was named to the preseason All-ACC team.

Departures

Recruits

2017 Recruiting class

Roster

}

Schedule

|-
!colspan=12 style=| Exhibition

|-
!colspan=12 style=| Non-conference regular season

|-
!colspan=12 style=| ACC regular season

|-
!colspan=12 style=| ACC Tournament

|-
!colspan=12 style=| NCAA tournament

Rankings

*AP does not release post-NCAA tournament rankings

Awards
Julius Erving Award finalist
Dwayne Bacon

Watchlists
Julius Erving Award
Dwayne Bacon

Karl Malone Award
Jonathan Isaac

Naismith Award
Dwayne Bacon

Wooden Award
Dwayne Bacon

Oscar Robertson Trophy 
Dwayne Bacon

Wayman Tisdale Award
Jonathan Isaac

Honors

All-ACC

All-Americans

NBA draft
Two players were selected in the 2017 NBA draft:

References

External links
 Official Team Website

Florida State
Florida State Seminoles men's basketball seasons
Florida State Seminoles men's basketball
Florida State Seminoles men's basketball
Florida State